JHP may refer to:
 Jacketed hollow point, a type of bullet
 Jhimpir railway station, in Pakistan
 Joseph Henry Press, an American publisher
 John Hunt Publishing, an English publisher
 Journal of Humanistic Psychology
 Journal of the History of Philosophy, a peer-reviewed academic journal